Parliamentary elections were held in Lithuania between 8 and 10 May 1926. The Lithuanian Popular Peasants' Union remained the largest party, winning 24 of the 85 seats in the third Seimas. They formed a left-wing coalition government with the Social Democratic Party of Lithuania, which was overthrown in a military coup in December. The Seimas was subsequently disbanded and Lithuanian Nationalist Union leader Antanas Smetona was appointed President.

Results

References

Lithuania
Parliamentary
Lithuania
Parliamentary elections in Lithuania